This is a list of the main career statistics of Serbian professional tennis player Novak Djokovic. Djokovic has won 93 ATP singles titles, including a joint-record of 22 Grand Slam singles titles (tied with Rafael Nadal), six ATP Finals titles, and a record 38 ATP Masters titles. He is the only male player to have won all nine of the Masters tournaments, and has done so twice. He is the first and only male Serbian player to win a Grand Slam and attain the number 1 ranking. He was also a bronze medalist at the 2008 Beijing Olympics. Djokovic is the only male player to win each Grand Slam, all nine Masters tournaments, and the ATP Finals at least twice. Djokovic was first ranked world No. 1 by the Association of Tennis Professionals (ATP) on 4 July 2011, and holds the all-time record for most weeks as No.1 (380).

Historic achievements 
Djokovic has won 22 Grand Slam men's singles titles, tied with Rafael Nadal for the most Grand Slams won by a male player. He is the last out of eight male players all-time to achieve the Career Grand Slam in men's singles. Him and Nadal are the only players to win each slam twice in the Open Era and the only ones to do so on 3 different surfaces, and to do so after Roy Emerson and Rod Laver in the history of tennis. Djokovic is the only male player to hold all four Grand Slams on three different surfaces (hard, clay, and grass) at once (2015 Wimbledon to 2016 French Open), and became the only male player to win 30 consecutive Grand Slam matches across three different surfaces (2015 Wimbledon – 2016 Wimbledon). 

Djokovic has reached an all-time record of 33 Grand Slam finals, and has played the final of each Grand Slam tournament at least 6 times. He is the only male player to appear in 9 finals at 2 different Grand Slams (10 Australian Open and 9 US Open finals).

He is the second male player in the Open Era to win the first 3 Grand Slams in a calendar year (2021), after Laver won all 4 Grand Slams in 1969. He is the second male player in history after Federer to win 3 Grand Slam titles in three different seasons (2011, 2015, and 2021). He is the only male player to win 2 different Grand Slams 7 or more times (10 Australian Open and 7 Wimbledon). He is fourth male player to win 4 consecutive Wimbledon titles after Borg, Sampras and Federer.

He is the third male player in the Open Era to win at least 2 Grand Slams on hard, clay and grass courts after Mats Wilander and Nadal. He also has a record 38 ATP Masters 1000 titles, and has won 6 ATP Finals titles, including a record 4 consecutively from 2012 to 2015. His 6 ATP Finals titles are tied for the most wins alongside Federer.

Djokovic is the second male player to win three consecutive Grand Slam tournaments on three different surfaces in the same calendar year (hard, clay and grass), doing so in 2021, after Nadal in 2010.

Djokovic has won an all-time record of ten Australian Open men's singles titles. Djokovic is the only male player to win 3 consecutive Australian Open titles during the Open Era, which he has done twice (2011–13 and 2019–21). Djokovic is the second player in history to win a Grand Slam singles title at a tournament ten or more times, the other being Nadal at the French Open. He is undefeated in Australian Open finals and semifinals. 

Djokovic is the only player to defeat Nadal in straight sets in a Grand Slam final (2019 Australian Open), as well as the first player to defeat Nadal in straight sets at the French Open (2015 quarterfinal). Djokovic is the only player who has defeated Nadal in a French Open semifinal (2021), ending Nadal's undefeated record of 13–0 in French Open semifinals, as well as the only male player to defeat Nadal twice at the French Open. He is also the only player who has won the French Open after defeating Nadal, which he did at the 2021 French Open. From 2002 to 2022, apart from Nadal, Djokovic is the only male player to win more than one French Open. He is the second male player to win both the French Open and Paris Masters in the same year (2021) after Andre Agassi (1999).

Djokovic has won 18 titles on clay courts, including two French Open titles and 11 Masters titles. He is the only player to defeat Nadal in all three clay court Masters events, which he first achieved in the finals of Madrid and Rome in 2011 and in Monte Carlo in 2013. The latter victory also ended Nadal's consecutive run of 8 Monte Carlo Masters titles. Djokovic is the player with the most clay-court match wins over Nadal, with eight.

Djokovic has spent a record 380 weeks as world No.1. In 2021, he became the only male player in the Open Era to finish as the Year-end No. 1 a record seven times, surpassing Sampras' previous record of six years. At the age of 34 in 2021, he is also the oldest year-end No. 1 in ATP rankings history.

Djokovic is the first tennis player to earn more than 100 million US dollars in prize money, and has earned more than any other player across his career.

From the 2010 Davis Cup final to the 2011 French Open, Djokovic held a 43-match win streak, behind only Guillermo Vilas (46 matches in 1977) and Ivan Lendl (44 matches from 1981 to 1982) on the all-time list. He won 41 straight matches from the start of 2011 until that year's French Open semifinals, second only to John McEnroe's record at the start of an ATP year (he started 42–0 in 1984).

Djokovic's 2011 season, during which he went on a 41–match winning streak, is considered to be one of the greatest seasons by a tennis player in the Open Era. He won 10 titles on three different surfaces, won 3 majors while making the semifinals of the fourth, won 5 ATP Masters 1000 events, and made the finals of 11 of the 16 events he entered in. He defeated Nadal and Federer 10 times combined, going 10–1 against them, while finishing the year with a 70–6 record. He was eliminated in the round-robin portion of the ATP Finals.

In 2015, he won 3 majors in one season for a second time, while reaching the final of the fourth, and won a record 6 ATP Masters 1000 titles, before finishing the year with his fourth consecutive ATP Finals championship. He won 11 titles while reaching the finals of 15 of the 16 events he entered in, to finish with an 82–6 record. His record against Nadal and his new rival Murray was 10–1 combined, although he was less dominant versus Federer compared to 2011 with a 5–3 record. This season was seen as one of the most successful in the Open Era by many fans and analysts.

Djokovic competed in 8 Masters 1000 finals in 2015, breaking the previous record of 6 finals. He is the only player to win all 9 Masters 1000 tournaments, and the only player to win each tournament twice. As a result, he is considered to be the most successful player in ATP Masters history. Overall, he has reached a record 56 finals.

Djokovic is widely viewed as one of the greatest hard court players in the Open Era. He has won a record 13 hard court major titles (10 Australian Open and 3 US Open titles). He has also won an Open Era record of 27 Masters hard court titles. In addition, Djokovic has a record 88.6% Grand Slam match win percentage on hard courts.

As of November 2022, Djokovic holds the Open Era record for the highest career winning percentage (minimum 500 wins) at 83.5% (1046–207 record).

Performance timelines
{{Performance key|short=yes}}
Only main-draw results in ATP Tour, Grand Slam tournaments, Davis Cup/ATP Cup/Laver Cup and Olympic Games are included in win–loss records.

Singles
Current through the 2023 Dubai Championships

Doubles

* not held due to COVID-19 pandemic.

Grand Slam tournaments 
Djokovic has the record number of Grand Slam men's singles titles in history (22), tied with Nadal. He holds the records for the most hardcourt titles (13), hardcourt finals (19) and finals (33). His ten titles at Australian Open is an all-time record. Djokovic is one of two (Nadal) men in the Open Era to achieve a double Career Grand Slam, and the only one to hold all four Grand Slam titles simultaneously across three different surfaces. He is also the only player to reach at least 6 men's singles finals at each of the Grand Slam events.

Grand Slam tournament finals: 33 (22 titles, 11 runner-ups)

Year–End Championships
Djokovic has won the most Year-End Championships (6, tied with Roger Federer). He holds the record for consecutive titles (4). He won his first five finals, also a record.

Year–End Championship finals: 8 (6 titles, 2 runner-ups)

ATP Masters
Djokovic has won a record 38 Masters titles overall as well as a record 27 on hard courts. In 2015, he set the records for most titles (6) and most finals (8) in the same season. He also holds the record for consecutive wins in finals (12). In 2018 he became the first tennis player in history to win a title at all nine Masters tournaments, and in 2020 he became the first to win each tournament at least twice.

Finals: 56 (38 titles, 18 runner-ups)

Summer Olympics

Singles: 3 (1 bronze medal, 2 4th places)

Mixed doubles: 1 (1 4th place)

ATP career finals

Singles: 132 (93 titles, 39 runner-ups)

Doubles: 3 (1 title, 2 runner-ups)

Team competitions

ATP Challengers & ITF Futures

Singles: 6 (6 titles)

Doubles: 1 (1 title)

ATP ranking

Djokovic has spent the most weeks as ATP world No. 1, a record total of 380. Djokovic holds the record for the most ATP year-end No. 1 rankings, having achieved the feat 7 times. Djokovic is the oldest ATP year-end number one player.

General 

Djokovic has spent the total 903* consecutive weeks in the ATP Tour's top-100.

He also has spent the total 778* non-consecutive weeks in the ATP Tour's top-10.

He first ascended into the top-10 on 19 March 2007 when he moved up from No. 13 to No. 10. Since then, he's spent:

No. 1 – 380 weeks
No. 2 – 148 weeks*
No. 3 – 152 weeks
No. 4 – 32 weeks
No. 5 – 21 weeks
No. 6 – 19 weeks
No. 7 – 17 weeks
No. 8 – 2 weeks
No. 9 – 0 weeks
No. 10 – 7 weeks

*.

ATP world No. 1

 Note: The ATP Tour was suspended from 16 March to 21 August, 2020. The ATP ranking was frozen from 23 March to 23 August, 2020.

Weeks at No. 1 by span

Time spans holding the ranking

Age at first and last dates No. 1 ranking was held

ATP world No. 1 ranking

No. 1 stats

Weeks at No. 1 by decade

2010s

2020s 

*.

Coaches
The following is a list of coaches who are coaching or coached Djokovic during his career, with his current coaches in boldface:
 Jelena Genčić (1993–1999)
 Nikola Pilić (1999–2003)
 Dejan Petrović (2004–2005)
 Riccardo Piatti (2005–2006)
 Marián Vajda (2006–2017, 2018–2022)
 Ronen Bega (2006–2009), fitness coach
 Mark Woodforde (2007)
 Todd Martin (2009–2010)
 Gebhard Gritsch (2009–2017, 2018–2019), fitness coach
 Dušan Vemić (2011–2013)
 Boris Becker (2013–2016)
 Andre Agassi (2017–2018)
 Mario Ančić (2017)
 Marco Panichi  (2017–2018, 2019–present), fitness coach
 Radek Štěpánek (2018)
 Goran Ivanišević (2019–present)

Head-to-head records

Record against top-10 players
Djokovic's match record against those who have been ranked in the top 10. Active players are in boldface.

Record against players ranked No. 11–20

Active players are in boldface. 

 Viktor Troicki 13–1
 Andreas Seppi 12–0
 Philipp Kohlschreiber 12–2
 Feliciano López 9–1
 Sam Querrey 9–2
 Alexandr Dolgopolov 6–0
 Albert Ramos Viñolas 6–0
 Bernard Tomic 6–0
 Kyle Edmund 6–1
 Paul-Henri Mathieu 6–1
 Jarkko Nieminen 6–1
 Robby Ginepri 5–0
 Florian Mayer 5–0
 Igor Andreev 4–0
 Borna Ćorić 4–0
 Marcel Granollers 4–0
 Cristian Garín 3–0
 Lorenzo Musetti 3–0
 Nikoloz Basilashvili 2–0
 Juan Ignacio Chela 2–0
 Francis Tiafoe 2–0
 Aslan Karatsev 2–1
 Benoît Paire 2–1
 Pablo Cuevas 1–0
 Alex de Minaur 1–0
 Dominik Hrbaty 1–0
 Jerzy Janowicz 1–0
 Tommy Paul 1–0
 Andrei Pavel 1–0
 Guido Pella 1–0
 Dmitry Tursunov 1–0
 Marco Cecchinato 1–1
 Chung Hyeon 1–1
 Xavier Malisse 1–1
 Fabrice Santoro 1–1
 Ivo Karlović 1–2
 Nick Kyrgios 1–2

*.

Players with winning records against Djokovic
Active players are in boldface. 

 Andy Roddick 4–5
 Fernando González 1–2
 Ivo Karlović 1–2
 Nick Kyrgios 1–2
 Carlos Alcaraz 0–1
 Taro Daniel 0–1
 Antony Dupuis 0–1
 Dan Evans 0–1
 Dennis van Scheppingen 0–1
 Filippo Volandri 0–1
 Marat Safin 0–2
 Jiří Veselý 0–2

*As of 10 July 2022.

Wins over top ranked players

Top 10 wins
Djokovic has the most wins over top 10 ranked players in the Open Era and is only one of the two players (the other being Federer) in the Open Era to reach 200 top-10 wins. He has a  record against players who were, at the time the match was played, ranked in the top 10. He also set the era's single season record with 31 wins in 2015.

In 2011, in a seven-tournament span, Djokovic defeated then world No. 1 Nadal in the finals of five prestigious events; Indian Wells Masters, Miami Masters, Madrid Masters, Rome Masters, and Wimbledon.

Winning streaks
Djokovic has had ten 20+ match win streaks in his career: 43 (2010–11), 29 (2019–20), 28 (2013–14), 28 (2015), 23 (2015), 22 (2012–13), 22 (2018), 22 (2021), 20 
(2022) and 20 (2022–23).

43–win streak 2010–11 
Djokovic's 43-match winning streak in 2010–11 is the fifth best in the Open Era in men's singles (see winning streaks on all the surfaces). It also covers 41 straight matches since the start of 2011, which is the second longest streak to start the year since 1980, behind John McEnroe (started 42–0 in 1984).

41–win streak in Australia since 2019 
Djokovic's 41-match winning streak in Australia began at the Australian Open in 2019 and it is still active.

38–win indoors streak 2012–2015
Djokovic had a 38 match indoor–court winning streak between 2012 and 2015.

30–win Grand Slam streak 2015–2016
Djokovic won an Open Era men's record 30-consecutive singles matches at Grand Slam (Open Era record), becoming the third man to hold all four major titles at once, joining Don Budge six major (1937–38) / 37 match wins streak (1937 Wimbledon–1938 US Championships) and Rod Laver four major (1962) / 31 match wins streak (1962 Australian Championships–1968 Roland Garros Final) & four major (1969) / 29 match wins streak (1969 Australian Open–1970 Wimbledon Round of 16).

28–win streak in China 2012–14 
Djokovic's 28-match winning streak in China began at the China Open in 2012 and was ended by Roger Federer at the Shanghai Masters in 2014.

26–win season streak 2020

Career Grand Slam tournament seedings

The tournaments won by Djokovic are bolded.

* Due to the COVID-19 pandemic, the 2020 Wimbledon Championships of the tournament was cancelled for the first time since World War II.
** Djokovic had deported from Australia a day before the 2022 Australian Open was to have begun stating to deny entry in Australia and his inability on exemption for vaccination requirements.
*** Djokovic withdrew before the draw announcement, as he could not travel to the United States due to the federal government's vaccination policy for non-US citizens.

Career milestone wins

 Note: Bold indicates that he went on to win the tournament.

Centennial match wins

Milestone Grand Slam match wins

Milestone hard court match wins

Milestone clay court match wins

Milestone grass court match wins

National and international representation

Davis Cup

Wins: 1

Participations: 55 (42–13)

   indicates the outcome of the Davis Cup match followed by the score, date, place of event, the zonal classification and its phase, and the court surface.

 Chantouria gave up the opening rubber because of a calf injury.
 Djokovic withdrew from the rubber due to flu symptoms he was suffering the whole week. He wasn't scheduled to play but after Janko Tipsarević had fallen out of the team suffering from a stomach bug and an ankle injury team captain Bogdan Obradović chose to substitute Djokovic.

ATP Cup

Wins: 1

Participations: 12 (11–1)

Summer Olympics matches

(16 wins – 10 losses)

Singles (13–6)

Doubles (1–3)

Mixed Doubles (2–1)

ATP Tour career earnings

* Statistics correct .

Notable exhibitions

Singles

Doubles

Team competitions

See also

List of career achievements by Novak Djokovic
Open Era tennis records – men's singles
All-time tennis records - men's singles
List of Grand Slam men's singles champions
List of Open Era Grand Slam champions by country
List of ATP number 1 ranked singles tennis players
List of highest ranked tennis players per country
Longest tiebreaker in tennis
2012 Summer Olympics national flag bearers
List of flag bearers for Serbia at the Olympics
 ATP Finals appearances
Serbia Davis Cup team
List of Serbia Davis Cup team representatives
Sport in Serbia
Big Four career statistics
Big Three

Notes

References

External links
 
 
 Novak Djokovic at the Olympic games winners profile
 

Statistics
Tennis career statistics
Sport in Serbia